Bowling Green is a city in and the county seat of Wood County, Ohio, United States, located  southwest of Toledo. The population was 30,028 at the 2010 census. It is part of the Toledo Metropolitan Area and a member of the Toledo Metropolitan Area Council of Governments. Bowling Green is the home of Bowling Green State University.

History

Settlement
Bowling Green was first settled in 1832, was incorporated as a town in 1855, and became a city in 1901. The village was named after Bowling Green, Kentucky, by a retired postal worker who had once delivered mail there.

Growth and Oil boom
In 1868 Bowling Green was designated as the county seat, succeeding Perrysburg.

With the discovery of oil in the area in the late 19th and early 20th century, Bowling Green enjoyed a boom to its economy. The results of wealth generated at the time can still be seen in the downtown storefronts, and along Wooster Street, where many of the oldest and largest homes were built. A new county courthouse was also constructed in the 1890s. The Neoclassical US post office was erected in 1913.

Industrialization
This period was followed by an expansion of the automobile industry. In late 1922 or early 1923, Coats Steam Car moved to the area and hired numerous workers. It eventually went out of business as the industry became centralized in Detroit, Michigan. 

Bank robbers Pretty Boy Floyd and Billy the Killer encountered police in Bowling Green in April 1931. Their armed confrontation resulted in the death of Billy the Killer. 

During World War II Italian and German prisoners of war were held nearby. They were used to staff the Heinz Tomato Ketchup factory in town. The ketchup factory closed in 1975. 

A runaway freight train carrying hazardous liquids passed through Bowling Green in 2001, in what is known as the known as the CSX 8888 incident. It traveled more than 65 miles south of Toledo before being stopped by a veteran railroad worker near Kenton; he jumped into the train while it was moving. No one was hurt and there was no property damage in the incident.

Geography
Bowling Green is within an area of land that was once the Great Black Swamp which was drained and settled in the 19th century. The nutrient-rich soil makes for highly productive farm land. Bowling Green, Ohio is in the North Western hemisphere at approximately 41.376132°N, -83.623897°W.

Climate

Demographics

2010 census
As of the census of 2010, there were 30,028 people, 11,288 households, and 4,675 families living in the city. The racial makeup of the city was 87.6% White, 6.4% African American, 0.2% Native American, 2.1% Asian, 1.4% from other races, and 2.2% from two or more races. Hispanic or Latino of any race were 4.8% of the population.

There were 11,288 households, of which 18.9% had children under the age of 18 living with them, 30.7% were married couples living together, 7.5% had a female householder with no husband present, 3.2% had a male householder with no wife present, and 58.6% were non-families. 35.8% of all households were made up of individuals, and 7.2% had someone living alone who was 65 years of age or older. The average household size was 2.16 and the average family size was 2.82.

The median age in the city was 23.2 years. 12.8% of residents were under the age of 18; 43.2% were between the ages of 18 and 24; 19.5% were from 25 to 44; 15.7% were from 45 to 64; and 8.9% were 65 years of age or older. The gender makeup of the city was 48.0% male and 52.0% female.

2000 census
As of the census of 2000, there were 29,636 people, 10,266 households, and 4,434 families living in the city. The racial makeup of the city was 91.84% White, 2.82% African American, 0.21% Native American, 1.83% Asian, 0.02% Pacific Islander, 1.81% from other races, and 1.46% from two or more races. Hispanic or Latino of any race were 3.48% of the population.

There were 10,266 households, out of which 20.2% had children under the age of 18 living with them, 33.2% were married couples living together, 7.5% had a female householder with no husband present, and 56.8% were non-families. 34.3% of all households were people living alone, including 7.0% who were 65 years of age or older. The average household size was 2.21, and the average family size was 2.84.

In the city, the population was spread out, with 13.1% under the age of 18, 46.6% from 18 to 24, 19.5% from 25 to 44, 13.2% from 45 to 64, and 7.6% who were 65 years of age or older. The median age was 22 years. For every 100 females, there were 87.9 males. For every 100 females age 18 and over, there were 85.4 males.

The median income for a household in the city was $30,599, and the median income for a family was $51,804. Males had a median income of $33,619 versus $25,364 for females. The per capita income for the city was $15,032. About 8.0% of families and 25.3% of the population were below the poverty line, including 12.8% of those under age 18 and 4.8% of those age 65 or over.

Arts and culture

Black Swamp Arts Festival

Every September, the Black Swamp Arts Festival takes place in Bowling Green. Started in 1993, the festival has grown in size and prestige.

The name Black Swamp was chosen for the festival because it is a common term for this area of the state. The Great Black Swamp, which was drained near the end of the 1800s to make farming possible, extended from Lake Erie to Indiana. It was the last area of Ohio to be settled. Bowling Green is the largest city now in the remnants of this vast wetland.

Main Street is closed to traffic for the festival, and artists from around the country display and sell a variety of artwork. There are also musical performances, children's activities, and food. The festival has grown to include over 100 juried artists, 50 local/invitational artists, four live music stages, youth arts, acts of art, and concessions. Numerous types of music, including blues, jazz, and rock, are heard from the main stage. The Festival has a reputation for booking a diverse and entertaining musical line up. The Main Stage features national and international touring bands of all genres. The Black Swamp Arts Festival attracts 40,000 art and music fans to Bowling Green.

National Tractor Pulling championships

Bowling Green has hosted the National Tractor Pulling Championships since 1967. This annual event, one of the largest in the nation, is held at the Wood County Fairgrounds and draws an estimated 60,000 people. The Fairgrounds is located along Poe Road between Haskins Road (State Route 64) and Brim Road.

Wood County Fair
Every year Bowling Green hosts the Wood County Fair, a week-long festival that begins shortly before or after the end of July. The fairgrounds are located off Poe Road between Haskins and Brim roads. Main Events include: Tractor Pull, Altered Farm stock Tractor Pull, Antique Tractor Pull, Mule Pull, Semi-Truck Pull, Youth Parade, Demolition/Combine Derby, Catch-a-pig, Cheerleading Competition, Harness Racing, and the annual Country Music Concert. Another special event is quilt day. Special Days like Senior Citizen day or DARE day allow discounted tickets.

Country singers who have performed at the Wood County Fair:

Boxcar Willie (1982)
Phil Vassar and Miranda Lambert (2006)
Tracy Lawrence and Josh Turner (2007)
Jason Michael Carroll and Billy Currington (2008)
Little Big Town (2009)
Kenny Rogers (2010)
Gretchen Wilson (2012)
Oak Ridge Boys and Night Ranger (2015)

Winterfest
Similar to other winter cities, Bowling Green hosts an annual event for three days in February to celebrate winter, snow, and cold weather activities. Winterfest in Bowling Green centers around the rich ice skating and ice hockey traditions of the town. Winterfest events are held all over Bowling Green, and on and off the campus of Bowling Green State University. Notable events include curling, carriage rides, ice sculptures, and live entertainment, plus BGSU Athletic events such as hockey and basketball games and figure skating exhibition with local stars such as Scott Hamilton.

Education

Primary education
Public elementary schools of the Bowling Green City School District include
Kenwood Elementary, Conneaut Elementary and Crim Elementary. Ridge Elementary was closed in 2013 and Milton Elementary was closed in 2011. Two private primary schools, Bowling Green Christian Academy and the Montessori School of Bowling Green, and one parochial, St. Aloysius, also call Bowling Green home.  The Bowling Green Early Childhood Learning Center (Montessori) offers kindergarten and Plan, Do and Talk goes up to grade three.

Secondary education
 Bowling Green Middle School
 Bowling Green Senior High School

Post-secondary education
 Bowling Green State University is located on the northeast side of the city, along and north of Wooster Street (Ohio State Route 64, Ohio State Route 105). As of September 2020 it has 20,232 students.

Public library

Bowling Green has the main branch of the Wood County District Public Library.

Media

Newspapers
 Sentinel Tribune
 The BG News
 BG Independent Media

Radio stations
 WBGU 88.1 FM
 WFAL Falcon Radio
 WRQN
 WJYM 730 AM
 WWOC-LP 97.7 FM

Television station
 WBGU-PBS

Transportation

A public demand response bus service is operated by the city through B.G. Transit.
Bowling Green State University offers shuttle services via its own buses with routes throughout campus and the downtown area.
Bowling Green is linked to North Baltimore via a  rail trail called the Slippery Elm Trail, with East Broadway Street in North Baltimore on the south end and Sand Ridge Road in Bowling Green on the north end.
 A CSX line runs through town.

Energy policy

Ohio's first utility-sized wind farm is located along U.S. Route 6 just west of the city limits. These turbines generate up to 7.2 megawatts of power, which is enough to supply electricity for some 3,000 residents. At the site of the turbines, a solar-powered kiosk provides information for visitors, including current information on wind speeds and the amount of energy being produced by the turbines.

Through the city's Municipal Utilities office, residents can request that their power come from green energy. As of March 1, 2014, the current power cost premium is $.007 per KWH.

However, Bowling Green's green credentials were damaged in 2008, when the city signed a power contract with AMP-Ohio to help build a 960-megawatt coal-fired power plant in Meigs County, Ohio. Several large environmental groups, including Sierra Club, the Natural Resources Defense Council, and the Ohio Environmental Council, opposed the building of a coal-fired power plant due to the pollution it would cause. In late 2009, AMP canceled the project, citing an estimated 37% increase in cost to more than $3 billion.

In January 2017 a new 165 acre, 20 megawatt solar plant began operation on the edge of the city. The plant experienced a slight disruption from the solar eclipse of August 21, 2017.

Economy

LifeFormations, a mechatronics company, is based in Bowling Green. They have made animatronics based on licensed properties such as Shrek for theme parks such as Universal Studios Florida.

Lubrizol maintains a soap and surfactant production plant in Bowling Green. The Bowling Green plant opened in 1994 and was expanded in 2013.

Aliquantum International maintains a sales office in Bowling Green. The company licences characters from the Japanese company San-X for local markets, such as Rilakkuma.

Poggemeyer Design Group, an architecture and engineering firm, maintains its headquarters in Bowling Green.

Notable people

 John Barnes, science-fiction writer
 Theresa Gavarone, Ohio Senator
 Alissa Czisny, figure skater, 2009 and 2011 U.S. champion
 William Easterly, economist / professor at NYU
 Randy Gardner, Chancellor, Ohio Department of Higher Education
 Scott Hamilton, figure skater, 1984 Olympic champion; television commentator
 Chris Hoiles, retired Major League Baseball player
 Doug Mallory, NFL assistant coach
 Mike Mallory, NFL assistant coach
 Paul Pope, alternative comic book writer/artist
 Andy Tracy, first baseman for the Philadelphia Phillies, alumnus of Bowling Green High School and Bowling Green State University
 Dave Wottle, runner, 1972 Olympic gold medalist
 Cara Zavaleta, reality TV personality and model
 Anthony De La Torre, actor

References

External links

 
 Bowling Green Convention & Visitors Bureau Website
 Bowling Green Chamber of Commerce

 
Cities in Wood County, Ohio
County seats in Ohio
Populated places established in 1901
Cities in Ohio